Li Yuanhong (courtesy name Songqing 宋卿) (October 19, 1864 – June 3, 1928) was a Chinese politician during the Qing dynasty and the Republic of China. He was the president of the Republic of China between 1916 and 1917, and between 1922 and 1923.

Early life 

A native of Huangpi, Hubei, he was the son of a Qing veteran of the Taiping Rebellion named Li Chaoxiang. He graduated from the Tianjin naval academy in 1889 and served as an engineer in the First Sino-Japanese war. His cruiser was sunk and he survived because of his life belt, since he could not swim.  He later joined the Hubei New Army and became senior military officer in Hankou. In 1910, he attempted to break up revolutionary rings that infiltrated his 21st Mixed Brigade. He did not arrest anyone caught in subversive activities, but simply dismissed them.

National prominence 

When the Xinhai Revolution of 1911 broke out, the Wuchang mutineers needed a visible high-ranking officer to be their figurehead.  Li was well respected, had supported the Railway Protection Movement, and knew English, which would be useful in dealing with foreign concerns.  He was reportedly dragged from hiding under his wife's bed and forced at gunpoint to be the provisional military governor of Hubei despite killing several of the rebels.  Though reluctant at first, he embraced the revolution after its growing momentum and was named military governor of China on 30 November.  Qing Premier Yuan Shikai negotiated a truce with him on 4 December.

While Li commanded the rebel army, Sun Yat-sen of the Revolutionary Alliance became the first provisional president in Nanjing on 1 January 1912.  Li was made vice president as a compromise and he formed People's Society to campaign for the presidency.  Meanwhile, the north was still under the control of the Qing.  A negotiation made Sun step down in favor of Yuan Shikai as president with Li keeping his vice-presidency.  This ended the Qing dynasty and reunified north and south China.  People's Society later merged with the pro-Yuan Republican Party.

In 1913, he combined the Republicans with Liang Qichao's Democratic Party to form the Progressive Party. The Progressives became the biggest rivals to the opposition Nationalists led by Sun.  He supported Yuan against Sun during the Second Revolution which earned him the enmity of his former comrades.  When Yuan pulled off his presidential coup, Li was viewed as a potential threat and confined in Beijing where he became a passive bystander under Yuan's grip.  Yuan could never fully trust Li because he wasn't a protégé within the Beiyang Army's inner circle and because of his past association with the revolutionaries.  Nevertheless, Yuan married his son to Li's daughter to strengthen their ties. Li kept his office and honors as vice president but had no power.  Some factions called on Li to claim the presidency when Yuan crowned himself emperor in 1916.  He refused for fear of his life but he also declined the aristocratic title of Prince granted by Yuan in the Empire of China (1915–16), a decision which would help his standing later on.  Li remained in self-imposed isolation at his residence during the monarchic period, and until the death of Yuan.

Presidency and later life 
Li served as president from 7 June 1916 to 17 July 1917.  When Yuan died, he left a will containing Li's name along with Premier Duan Qirui and Xu Shichang.  The will was an imperial tradition started by the Kangxi Emperor, and was not constitutional in the republic. Nevertheless, the Beiyang generals pressed Li into office, since he was acceptable to the rebellious southern provinces.  Li tried to return to the 1912 constitutional arrangement, but Duan held the real power.  The National Assembly of the Republic of China reconvened on 1 August 1916, after having been disbanded over two and a half years earlier.  Duan was eager to pull China into World War I but Li was more hesitant.  They conflicted greatly over Duan's decision to cut ties with Germany.  Li forced Duan to resign on 23 May 1917, when the premier's secret loans from Japan were exposed. Duan fled to Tianjin to muster his forces, and most generals abandoned the government.  In response, Li asked General Zhang Xun for assistance. In exchange, Zhang asked for the dissolution of parliament which was granted on 13 June.  Zhang, who was secretly pro-German, unexpectedly occupied Beijing from 14 June to 12 July 1917 and kept the president prisoner. Zhang then proceeded with a move that would undermine most of his support when he attempted to restore Emperor Puyi and the Qing dynasty on 1 July.  Li was released to the Japanese legation where he asked for Duan's assistance in saving the republic.  Duan overthrew Zhang within two weeks, and restored the republic by 12 July; Duan himself was reinstated as premier by 14 July.  Vice President Feng Guozhang was made acting president in Nanjing. On 17 July, distraught from recent events, Li officially resigned from office and moved to Tianjin in retirement.

He served again as president of China between 11 June 1922 and 13 June 1923 after Cao Kun forced out President Xu Shichang.  Li was chosen because he was respected by all of the factions and was hoped to reunify the country. He accepted only with the private assurances that warlord forces be disbanded; they were never honored.  Like his first term, he called back the original National Assembly but he was even more powerless than before.  He organized the "Able Men Cabinet" consisting of prestigious experts but it became undone when he arrested the finance minister for graft after examining rumours and circumstantial evidence; a court threw out the charges.  Cao soon harbored presidential ambitions himself and orchestrated strikes to force Li out of office.  Cao went as far as trying to bribe the assembly into impeaching him.  When Li was vacating the capital, he attempted to take the presidential seal with him but was intercepted.  He fled to Japan for medical treatment and returned to Tianjin in 1924 where he later died. His tomb, built in 1935 and restored in 2011, is situated on campus of Central China Normal University in Wuhan. He married Wu Jingjun (1870-1930) and had four children.

See also 
 History of the Republic of China

References

External links 
 

|-

|-

1864 births
1928 deaths
20th-century Chinese heads of government
Burials in Wuhan
Empire of China (1915–1916)
People of the 1911 Revolution
Politicians from Wuhan
Presidents of the Republic of China
Progressive Party (China) politicians
Republic of China politicians from Hubei
Republican Party (China) politicians
Tongmenghui members
Vice presidents of the Republic of China